

The Boston Lyceum Bureau (est.1868) in Boston, Massachusetts, was a project of James Redpath and George L. Fall. Its office stood at no.36 Bromfield Street. "Through its agency, many ... lecturers and authors of celebrity have been introduced to American audiences," including Frederick Douglass, Mark Twain, and George MacDonald.

The partnership dissolved around 1874. Redpath continued briefly with the "Redpath Lyceum Bureau" which featured many of the same lecturers and performers as before. Eventually, other proprietors took over and the "Boston Lyceum Bureau" and the "Redpath Lyceum Bureau" expanded vigorously into the 20th century, with branches throughout the United States.

Lecturers/Performers

 Susan B. Anthony
 Henry Ward Beecher
 Josh Billings
 Emma Hardinge Britten
 Moses T. Brown
 Isabella Dallas-Glynn
 Frederick Douglass
 Adrian J. Ebell
 Fanny R. Edmunds
 Ralph Waldo Emerson
 Thomas Fitch
 Edward Everett Hale
 B. Waterhouse Hawkins
 John Hay
 Isaac I. Hayes
 Thomas Wentworth Higginson
 Lottie Hough
 Julia Ward Howe
 The Hyers Sisters
 Mary A. Livermore
 David Ross Locke
 George MacDonald
 Mendelssohn Quintette Club
 Rev. W.H.H. Murray
 Mr. & Mrs. Madison Obrey
 Oliver Optic
 Wendell Phillips
 Kate Reignolds
 Erminia Rudersdorff
 Matthew Hale Smith
 Elizabeth Cady Stanton
 Charles Sumner
 Virginia F. Townsend
 Mark Twain
 Edwin Percy Whipple

See also
 James Redpath

References

Further reading

 Pond. "The Lyceum." The Cosmopolitan. April 1896.
 James "Redpath and the pioneer bureau he founded." Lyceum Magazine. Aug. 1922.

Financial District, Boston
1868 establishments in Massachusetts
1874 disestablishments in Massachusetts
Cultural history of Boston
Economic history of Boston
19th century in Boston
Speakers bureaus
Lyceum movement
American companies disestablished in 1874
American companies established in 1868